Ride on Stranger is a 1979 Australian mini series about a woman in the 1930s, based on the novel of the same name by Australian author Kylie Tennant.

Cast
 Liddy Clark as Shannon Jones
 Noni Hazlehurst as Beryl
 Michael Aitkens as John Terry
 Henri Szeps as Vincent Sladde
 Barbara Wyndon as Aunt Edith
 Warwick Sims as Damien Quilter
 Peter Carroll as Mervyn Leggatt 
 John Bluthal as Joseph Litchin
 Moya O'Sullivan as Ada Jones
 Ron Graham as Darcey Jones
 Bunney Brooke as Grannie Jones
 Noel Trevarthen as Chaverin Brome 
 Debra Lawrence as Jenny

References

External links
Ride on Stranger at Australian Television

Ride on Stranger at Australian Screen Online
Ride on Stranger at Auslit
Ride on Stranger at Screen Australia

English-language television shows
Television shows based on Australian novels
1970s Australian television miniseries
1979 Australian television series debuts
1979 Australian television series endings